The Houston Cougars football program is an NCAA Division I FBS football team that represents the University of Houston. The team is commonly referred to as "Houston" or "UH" (spoken as "U of H"). Houston has been a member of the American Athletic Conference since 2013. Since the beginning of the 2019 season, the Cougars have been coached by Dana Holgorsen, the program's 15th head coach. The team played its first season in 1946 and has since won or tied for 11 conference championships and six division championships.

Seasons

Notes

References

Lists of college football seasons

Texas sports-related lists
Houston-related lists